Miscellaneous Technical is a Unicode block ranging from U+2300 to U+23FF, which contains various common symbols which are related to and used in the various technical, programming language, and academic professions. For example:

 Symbol ⌂ (HTML hexadecimal code is &#x2302;) represents a house or a home.
 Symbol ⌘ (&#x2318;) is a "place of interest" sign. It may be used to represent the Command key on a Mac keyboard.
 Symbol ⌚ (&#x231A;) is a watch (or clock).
 Symbol ⏏ (&#x23CF;) is the "Eject" button symbol found on electronic equipment.
 Symbol ⏚ (&#x23DA;) is the "Earth Ground" symbol found on electrical or electronic manual, tag and equipment.

It also includes most of the uncommon symbols used by the APL programming language.

Miscellaneous Technical (2300–23FF) in Unicode 
In Unicode, Miscellaneous Technical symbols placed in the hexadecimal range 0x2300–0x23FF, (decimal 8960–9215), as described below.

(2300–233F) 

1.Unicode code points U+2329 & U+232A are deprecated.

(2340–237F)

(2380–23BF)

(23C0–23FF)

Block

Emoji

The Miscellaneous Technical block contains eighteen emoji: U+231A–U+231B, U+2328, U+23CF, U+23E9–U+23F3 and U+23F8–U+23FA.

Fifteen of these characters have standardized variants defined, to specify emoji-style (U+FE0F VS16) or text presentation (U+FE0E VS15) for each character, for a total of 30 variants. These fifteen base characters are: U+231A–U+231B, U+2328, U+23CF, U+23E9–U+23EA, U+23ED–U+23EF, U+23F1–U+23F3 and U+23F8–U+23FA.

History
The following Unicode-related documents record the purpose and process of defining specific characters in the Miscellaneous Technical block:

See also 
 Unicode mathematical operators and symbols
 Unicode symbols
 Media control symbols

References

Symbols

Unicode blocks